Farida Pasha (August 21, 1952 – January 16, 2021) was an Indonesian actress who starred in more than fifty films, many in the horror genre, including  (1977),  (1981),  (2012), and The Secret: Suster Ngesot Urban Legend (2019). However, Pasha was best known to audiences for her role as Mak Lampir, the main villain in the television series, Misteri Gunung Merapi (Mystery of Mount Merapi), from 1998 to 2005.

Pasha was born in Tasikmalaya, West Java, on August 21, 1952.

Farida Pasha was initially hospitalized for vertigo and early stage pneumonia, but soon tested positive for COVID-19. She died from complications of COVID-19 at Tarakan Hospital in Jakarta on January 16, 2021, at the age of 68. She was survived by her daughter, Gina Sonia, and granddaughter, singer Ify Alyssa.

References

External links

1952 births
2021 deaths
Indonesian actresses
Indonesian television actresses
Indonesian film actresses
Sundanese people
People from Tasikmalaya
Actresses from West Java
Deaths from the COVID-19 pandemic in Indonesia